Northeast (NE or N.E.) is the northeastern quadrant of Washington, D.C., the capital of the United States. It encompasses the area located north of East Capitol Street and east of North Capitol Street.

Geography
Northeast includes the 35 neighborhoods of:

 Arboretum
 Benning
 Benning Heights
 Brentwood
 Brookland
 Burrville
 Carver Langston
 Capitol Hill
 Central Northeast/Mahaning Heights
 Deanwood
 East Corner
 Eastland Gardens
 Eckington
 Edgewood
 Fort Lincoln
 Fort Totten
 Gateway
 Hillbrook
 Ivy City
 Kenilworth
 Kingman Park
 Lamond Riggs
 Langdon
 Lincoln Heights
 Mayfair
 Michigan Park
 Near Northeast
 North Michigan Park
 Pleasant Hill
 Riggs Park
 River Terrace
 Stronghold
 Trinidad
 Woodridge

A significant section of Capitol Hill is also located in Northeast, as is part of NoMa.

Landmarks
Northeast is home to Gallaudet University, a federally chartered private university for the education of the deaf and hard of hearing located in the Trinidad neighborhood. It is also home to The Catholic University of America and Trinity Washington University, two of the Catholic institutions which give the Brookland neighborhood its nickname of "Little Rome" or "Little Vatican." Others include the Basilica of the National Shrine of the Immaculate Conception, the Saint John Paul II National Shrine, the Mount St. Sepulchre Franciscan Monastery, the Ukrainian Catholic National Shrine of the Holy Family, Saint Anselm's Abbey Benedictine Monastery, the Dominican House of Studies, the Missionaries of Charity Gift of Peace Home, the Capuchin College, and the headquarters of the United States Conference of Catholic Bishops.

The quadrant is home to two large public gardens located below the waistline of the Anacostia River: the United States National Arboretum and Kenilworth Aquatic Gardens. The headquarters of The Heritage Foundation, one of the nation's largest think tanks, and The Washington Times, a daily newspaper in the city, are also located in Northeast.

Transportation

Northeast is bounded by North Capitol Street on the west, Eastern Avenue to the east, and East Capitol Street to the south. Other principal roads include the Baltimore–Washington Parkway (DC 295); Bladensburg Road and South Dakota Avenue running north–south; and Florida Avenue, Benning Road, New York Avenue (U.S. Route 50), and Rhode Island Avenue (U.S. Route 1) running east–west.

Northeast is served by all six lines of the Washington Metro: the Orange, Silver, Red, Blue,  Yellow, and Green Lines. Union Station is a major intermodal hub, combining the busiest station in the Metrorail system; rail service by Amtrak as well as the MARC and Virginia Railway Express commuter rail systems; and bus services provided by Greyhound, Peter Pan, Trailways, Megabus, and other bus companies. The DC Streetcar's H Street NE/Benning Road Line also serves the area.

Politics
Politically, Northeast includes most of Ward 5, much of Ward 6 and Ward 7, and parts of Ward 4.

Demographics
The population of Northeast is predominantly African-American, particularly east of the Anacostia River.

See also
SW—Southwest, Washington, D.C.
SE—Southeast, Washington, D.C.
NW—Northwest, Washington, D.C.

External links

Stanton Park
Report on WAMU: Northeast DC Heritage Trail Opening

 
.